Jarius Jessereel Wynn (born August 29, 1986) is a former American football defensive end. He was drafted by the Green Bay Packers in the sixth round (182nd overall) of the 2009 NFL Draft and won a Super Bowl ring in Super Bowl XLV over the Pittsburgh Steelers. He played college football at Georgia.

Wynn has also played for the Tennessee Titans, San Diego Chargers. Dallas Cowboys and Buffalo Bills.

Early years
Wynn attended Lincoln County High School and was First-team GHSA All-State Class-A as a senior defensive lineman in 2004. He earned First-team All-State honors as an offensive lineman in 2003.

College career
Wynn attended Georgia Military College and was Second-team National Junior College Athletic Association (NJCAA) All-American honors following the 2006 campaign as well as team captain and defensive MVP.  He tallied 21 tackles, including a team-leading eight for losses, two sacks, forced four fumbles and had one fumble recovery in 2006.  Wynn was rated the No. 1 junior college defensive tackle prospect in the nation for the class of 2007 by JCGridiron.com.

After enrolling at Georgia in January 2007, he appeared in and started 13 games the following season. He led the team with 69 tackles. In 2008, Wynn appeared in 13 games, making twelve starts, recording 54 tackles and six quarterback hurries.

Professional career

Pre-draft

Green Bay Packers
Wynn was selected by the Green Bay packers in the sixth round (182nd overall) of the 2009 NFL Draft.

During the 2010 preseason, Wynn was released during the routine cuts that are mandated by the NFL for the 53-man roster. He tried out for the Seattle Seahawks but wasn't signed. It wasn't long before Green Bay Packer defensive end Justin Harrell was injured during the Packers' season opener against the Philadelphia Eagles, placing him on the injured reserve list for the remainder of the season and causing the Packers to re-sign Wynn on September 14, 2010.

On August 27, 2012, the Packers released him in order to meet roster limit requirements.

Tennessee Titans
Wynn signed as a free agent with the Tennessee Titans on November 7, 2012.

San Diego Chargers
Wynn signed with the San Diego Chargers on April 3, 2013. He posted 3 tackles and one sack in 5 games, before being released on October 8.

Dallas Cowboys
Wynn was signed by the Dallas Cowboys on October 15, 2013 due to injuries to the team's defensive line. He played mostly as a backup (one start at defensive tackle), finishing with 12 tackles (3 for loss), one sack, 6 quarterback pressures and 2 passes defensed.

Buffalo Bills
Wynn signed with the Buffalo Bills as a free agent on April 8, 2014. After registering 18 quarterback pressures, 2 sacks and 2 passes defensed, he was re-signed to a two-year, $2.2 million contract on March 12, 2015. Wynn suffered a torn ACL in the first 2015 preseason game against the Carolina Panthers and was placed on the injured reserve list.

Wynn was released by the Buffalo Bills on May 2, 2016.  He later announced his retirement from professional football in 2017.

Personal life
Wynn's wife Martavia gave birth to Jaruis's second son, Jarius Jr., on the morning of Super Bowl XLV. He also has another son, Jeremiah, and a daughter Jasiah.

Wynn is the cousin of former NFL running back Garrison Hearst.

References

1986 births
Living people
African-American players of American football
American football defensive ends
Georgia Bulldogs football players
Green Bay Packers players
Players of American football from Georgia (U.S. state)
Tennessee Titans players
San Diego Chargers players
Dallas Cowboys players
Buffalo Bills players
21st-century African-American sportspeople
20th-century African-American people